John E. Shell (December 25, 1800  – January 20, 1865) was a nineteenth-century American lawyer and politician from Virginia.  Shell served as a Commonwealth's attorney, a member of the Virginia House of Delegates, and as a member of the Virginia Constitutional Convention of 1850.

Early life
Shell was born in Brunswick County, Virginia in 1800, and received a common school education there.

Career

As an adult, Shell established a successful law practice in Brunswick County despite his lack of formal education.

Shell served as a Delegate in the Virginia General Assembly for many years from Brunswick County, and was also appointed Commonwealth’s Attorney continuously during his career.  
 
In 1850, Shell was elected to the Virginia Constitutional Convention of 1850. He was one of three delegates elected from the Southside delegate district made up of his home district of Brunswick County, as well as Lunenburg, Nottoway and Dinwiddie Counties.

During the American Civil War, Flood served under the Confederate regime as Commonwealth’s Attorney of Brunswick County from 1861 until his death.

Death
John E. Shell died in Brunswick County, Virginia on January 21, 1865.

References

Bibliography

Members of the Virginia House of Delegates
1804 births
1865 deaths
People from Brunswick County, Virginia
County and city Commonwealth's Attorneys in Virginia
19th-century American politicians